Carl Augustus Heber (April 15, 1874 or 1875 –1956) was an American sculptor noted for his public monuments.

Heber was born in Stuttgart, Germany and at a young age moved to Dundee, Illinois.  He moved to Chicago where he studied at the Art Institute of Chicago with Lorado Taft. He continued his studies in Paris at the Académie Julian and the École des Beaux-Arts before returning to the United States.  He eventually settled in New York City and many of his works can be found in New York state.

Heber was a member of the National Sculpture Society and exhibited at their 1923 exhibit.

Selected works 
Heber's works include:

 General Philip Sheridan Monument, equestrian statue, Somerset, Ohio, 1905
  Schiller Monument, Schiller Park, Rochester, New York, 1907
  Virgil, or Roman Epic Poetry, allegorical statue on the Brooklyn Museum, Brooklyn, New York,  1909
 Spirit of Industry and Spirit of Commerce  granite reliefs on the Manhattan Bridge, New York, New York, 1909-1914
 Champlain Memorial, Crown Point Light, Crown Point, New York, another casting in Plattsburgh, New York, 1912
 Charles J. Everett Memorial, Goshen, New York, 1916
 James W. Husted Memorial, Peekskill, New York,  1917
 War Memorial, New York County Courthouse, New York, New York  1919 or 1920
 Veterans Monument, Wausau, Wisconsin, 1923
 Greenpoint War Memorial (World War I),  McGolrick Park, Brooklyn, NY ca. 1923
 Herald of the Dawn, Grand View Cemetery, Batavia, New York, 1925

References

1870s births
1956 deaths
20th-century American sculptors
20th-century American male artists
American male sculptors
National Sculpture Society members
Emigrants from the German Empire to the United States
People from West Dundee, Illinois